Valley Creek may refer to:

Valley Creek (Minnesota)
Valley Creek (Pennsylvania)
Valley Creek (South Dakota)